is a railway station on the Keikyu Airport Line in Ōta, Tokyo, Japan, operated by the private railway operator Keikyu. Its station number is KK14.

Lines
Anamori-inari Station is served by the Keikyu Airport Line.

Station layout

This ground-level station consists of two side platforms serving two tracks.

History
The station opened on 28 June, 1902.

Keikyu introduced station numbering to its stations on 21 October, 2010; Anamoriinari was assigned station number KK14.

See also
 List of railway stations in Japan

References

External links

  

Railway stations in Tokyo
Railway stations in Japan opened in 1902